Shuhurah is a village in eastern Yemen. It is located in the Hadhramaut Governorate.

External links
Towns and villages in the Hadhramaut Governorate

Populated places in Hadhramaut Governorate